Virginia Kneeland Frantz (November 13, 1896 – August 23, 1967) was a pathologist and educator credited with a series of discoveries in the study of thyroid, breast and pancreatic tumors.

Early life and education
She was born in New York City, the daughter of Yale and Anna Ilsley Ball Kneeland.  Frantz graduated from the Brearley School (1914) and Bryn Mawr College (1918). She then pursued medical studies at Columbia College of Physicians and Surgeons, graduating in 1922.   In 1920, she married fellow student Angus Macdonald Frantz. They had three children.

Career highlights
In 1922, New York Presbyterian Hospital, she became the first woman surgery intern.  From 1924 to 1962 she taught surgery at Columbia University College of Physicians and Surgeons, becoming a full professor in 1951. In 1935, she and Allen O. Whipple described the insulin secretion of pancreatic tumors. In 1959, she wrote a study on tumors of the pancreas which became the standard text in the field  In 1961 she became the first female president of the American Thyroid Association.

Awards and honors
Army-Navy Certificate of Appreciation for Civilian Service, 1948
Janeway Medal, 1962
Columbia University, Bicentennial Silver Medal, 1967
Student of Arthur Purdy Stout, noted alumnae of Brearley School, Columbia named award after her and presented to Rita Charon
Virginia Kneeland Frantz Society

Select publications
Franz, V. K., Forsythe, R., Hanford, J. M., & Rogers, W. M. (1942). Lateral aberrant thyroid. Ann. Surg, 115, 161–183.
Franz, M.D., Virginia Kneeland & Harvey, M.D., Harold Doric. (1946). Introduction to Surgery. New York and London: Geoffrey Cumberlege, Oxford University Press.
Franz, V. (1959). Papillary tumors of the pancreas: benign or malignant. Frantz VK. Atlas of tumor pathology. Washington DC: US Armed Forces Institute of Pathology, 32–3.

References

External links 

 Biography

American pathologists
1896 births
1967 deaths
Women pathologists
NewYork–Presbyterian Hospital physicians
Columbia University faculty
20th-century American women scientists
20th-century American scientists
Bryn Mawr College alumni
Columbia University Vagelos College of Physicians and Surgeons alumni
Brearley School alumni
Scientists from New York (state)
American women academics